Regional rail, also known as local trains and stopping trains, are passenger rail services that operate between towns and cities.  These trains operate with more stops over shorter distances than inter-city rail, but fewer stops and faster service than commuter rail.  Regional rail services operate beyond the limits of urban areas, and either connect similarly-sized smaller cities and towns, or cities and surrounding towns, outside or at the outer rim of a suburban belt.

Regional rail normally operates with an even service load throughout the day, although slightly increased services may be provided during rush-hour.  The service is less oriented around bringing commuters to the urban centers, although this may generate part of the traffic on some systems.  Other regional rail services operate between two large urban areas but make many intermediate stops.

In North America, "regional rail" is not recognized as a service classification between "commuter rail" and "inter-city rail"; heavy rail and light rail systems that offer bidirectional all-day service and connections between suburbs and edge cities, rather than merely transporting workers to a central business district, are considered "commuter rail".

Characteristics

The main difference between regional rail and commuter rail is that the latter is focused on moving people between where they live and where they work on a daily basis. Regional rail operates outside major cities. Unlike inter-city, it stops at most or all stations. It provides a service between smaller communities along the line, and also connections with long-distance services. Regional rail typically operates throughout the day but often at low frequency (once per hour or only a few times a day), whereas commuter rail provides a high-frequency service within a conurbation.

Regional rail services are much less likely to be profitable than inter-city (mainly because many passengers use monthly passes giving a lower price per ride, and that lower average speed gives less distance, meaning less ticket revenue per hour of operation) and hence require government subsidy. This is justified on social or environmental grounds, and because regional rail services often act as feeders for more profitable inter-city lines.

Since their invention, the distinction between regional and long-distance rail has also commonly been the use of multiple-unit propulsion, with longer-distance trains tending to be locomotive-hauled, although the development of trains such as the British Rail Class 390 and V/Line VLocity has blurred this distinction. Shorter regional rail services still usually be operated exclusively by multiple units where they exist, which have a shorter range and operate at lower average speeds than services on inter-city rail networks. Not using a locomotive also provides greater passenger capacity in the commuter role at peak periods. There are trains that are something in between regional and inter-city, like the Oresundtrain (between Copenhagen and three cities in Sweden over 3 hours away) with stopping pattern like a regional train and pass prices attracting work commuters.

Regional rail in different countries 
This list describes the terms used for regional rail in various countries, as described above.

See also
 Train categories in Europe
 Passenger rail terminology
 Elektrichka

References